Naranjo may refer to:

Places

Argentina
El Naranjo, Salta

Costa Rica
Naranjo (canton), in Alajuela
Naranjo de Alajuela, in the Naranjo canton

Cuba
Arroyo Naranjo, Cuba

Guatemala
 Naranjo, a pre-Columbian Maya archaeological site
 Río Naranjo (Guatemala)

Honduras
Los Naranjos, Honduras, a pre-Columbian archaeological site

Mexico
 El Naranjo, San Luis Potosi
 El Naranjo, a community in Luvianos
 Ejido El Naranjo, Tamaulipas

Philippines
Naranjo Islands

Puerto Rico
 Río Naranjo (Puerto Rico), a river in Puerto Rico
 Naranjo, Aguada, Puerto Rico, a barrio in Aguada, Puerto Rico
 Naranjo, Comerío, Puerto Rico, a barrio in Comerío, Puerto Rico
 Naranjo, Fajardo, Puerto Rico, a barrio in Fajardo, Puerto Rico
 Naranjo, Moca, Puerto Rico, a barrio in Moca, Puerto Rico
 Naranjo, Yauco, Puerto Rico, a barrio in Yauco, Puerto Rico

Other uses 
 Naranjo algorithm
 El naranjo, a novel by Carlos Fuentes#List of works

People with the surname
Alberto Naranjo (1941–2020), Venezuelan musician
Anita Fernandini de Naranjo (1902–1982), Peruvian politician
Bartolomé Gil Naranjo, 16th century Spanish judge in the province of Mérida, Venezuela
Carmen Naranjo (1928–2012), Costa Rican author
Cholly Naranjo (born 1936), Cuban major league baseball player
Claudio Naranjo  (1932–2019), Chilean anthropologist
Graciela Naranjo (1916–2001), Venezuelan singer
Guadalupe Acosta Naranjo (born 1964), Mexican politician
Javier Naranjo Villegas (1919–2014), Colombian Prelate of Roman Catholic Church

José Luis Naranjo y Quintana (born 1944), Mexican politician 
Juan de los Angeles Naranjo (1897–1952), Argentinian painter and draughtsman
Lisandro Duque Naranjo (born 1943), Colombian film director
Mónica Naranjo (born 1974), Spaniard singer
Oscar Rodríguez Naranjo (1907–2006), Colombian painter
Rodrigo Naranjo (born 1979), Chilean footballer
Tomás Carrasquilla Naranjo (1858–1940), Colombian writer
William Naranjo (born 1978), Colombian long-distance runner

See also
 Naranja (disambiguation)